Fondacaro is a surname. Notable people with the surname include:

Carlos Fondacaro (born 1987), Argentine footballer
Phil Fondacaro (born 1958), American actor and stuntman
Vincenzo Fondacaro (1844–1893), Italian captain

Italian-language surnames